A ship chandler is a retail dealer who specializes in providing supplies or equipment for ships.

Synopsis
For traditional sailing ships, items that could be found in a chandlery 
include sail-cloth, rosin, turpentine, tar, pitch, linseed oil, whale oil, tallow, lard, varnish, twine, rope and cordage, hemp, and oakum.  Tools (hatchet, axe, hammer, chisel, planes, lantern, nails, spike, boat hook, caulking iron, hand pump, and marlinspike) and items needed for cleaning such as brooms and mops might be available.  Galley supplies, leather goods, and paper might also appear.  In the age of sail ship chandlers could be found on remote islands, such as St. Helena, who were responsible for delivering water and fresh produce to stave off scurvy.

Today's chandlers deal more in goods typical for fuel-powered commercial ships (oil tanker, container ship, and bulk carrier) including maintenance supplies, cleaning compounds, and food stores for the crew.

A distinguishing feature of a ship chandler is the high level of service demanded and the short time required to fill and deliver orders.  Commercial ships discharge and turn around quickly, delay is expensive making the services of a dependable ship chandler in great demand.  Advantages, today and in the past, are that stores in unfamiliar ports do not need to be sought out (assuming the crew is allowed to leave by immigration authorities) and lines of credit make exchanging of currency a non-issue.  (Usually a ship owner would establish a line of credit with the chandler and then be billed for anything delivered to the crew.)  Chandlers also deliver the product, freeing up crew to work on repairs or, if allowed, take shore leave.

The ship chandlery business was central to the existence and the social and political dynamics of ports and their waterfront areas.  Ship chandlers are typically supplied by nearby merchants.

Gallery

References

Marine occupations
Maritime culture
Maritime history
Procurement
Ship management